Arcuatula is a genus of mussels from the family Mytilidae.

Species
The following species are currently recognised under the genus Arcuatula:

 Arcuatula arcuatula (Hanley, 1843)
 Arcuatula capensis (Krauss, 1848)
 Arcuatula elegans (Gray, 1828)
 Arcuatula glaberrima (Dunker, 1857)
 Arcuatula japonica (Dunker, 1857)
 Arcuatula leucosticte (Martens, 1897)
 Arcuatula papyria (Conrad, 1846)
 Arcuatula perfragilis (Dunker, 1857)
 Arcuatula senhousia (Benson, 1842)
 Arcuatula tristis (Dunker, 1857)
 Arcuatula variegate (Benson, 1856)

References

Mytilidae
Bivalve genera